Addax Petroleum was established in 1994 and since August 2009, has been a subsidiary of the Sinopec Group, one of the largest oil and gas producers in China, the biggest oil refiner in Asia and the third largest worldwide. Addax Petroleum was an international gas and oil production and exploration company mainly focused on the Middle East, the North Sea and Africa. Since 1994, the company become one of the largest oil producers in West Africa.

History
Addax Petroleum was originally part of the Addax & Oryx Group of Companies (AOG) which was founded in 1987. In 1989, AOG embarked on an ambitious expansion programme with the aim of becoming a vertically integrated oil company focused on the African continent. This led to the creation of Addax Petroleum in 1994 by Marc Lorenceau, a partner from the AOG trading group. Addax's initial steps in the upstream business was the acquisition of the Espoir field offshore Ivory Coast that had been relinquished by Phillips in 1988. Four years later, Addax Petroleum sold its remaining equity in the Espoir field to CNR (Canadian Natural Resources). In 1998, as oil prices were dropping, Ashland Oil Nigeria was for sale as the company wanted to leave the country's upstream sector. Perenco appeared to be the best bidder for Ashland's assets. However, the bidding process was overturned and these assets were eventually awarded to Addax Petroleum for the official amount of twenty million US dollars. 
After the tragic death of Mr. Lorenceau in a ski accident in late 2001, Jean Claude Gandur became the company's Chairman and CEO until the takeover by the Sinopec Group in August 2009.
At Sinopec's take over, Mr. Geng Xianglang was appointed CEO, followed by Mr. Zhang Yi in 2010. Mr. Geng Xianglang remains as Chairman of the board

Chronology
 1994: Addax Petroleum founded. PSC for Espoir field in Ivory Coast
 1998: Acquisition of Ashland Nigeria assets.
 1999: First drilling campaign in OML 123, offshore Nigeria
 2000: OML 123 Ebuguu Northeast discovery, offshore Nigeria
 2001: OML 123 Adanga South discovery, offshore Nigeria. Death of founder Marc Lorenceau.
Ngosso Concession Agreement signed, offshore Cameroon
 2003: OML 123 Oron West & North discoveries, offshore Nigeria.  OML 124 drilling campaign, onshore Nigeria
First Oil in OPL90 (OML 126) Okwori field, offshore Nigeria. 3 PSCs signed in the Nigeria/São Tomé & Principe Joint Development Zone (JDZ). Farm-in Agreement signed on Taq Taq field, Kurdistan Region of Iraq (KRI)
 2006: Listing on the Toronto Stock Exchange (TSX). Acquisition of Pan Ocean Energy's assets, onshore and offshore Gabon
Addax Petroleum Foundation established. Listing on the London Stock Exchange (LSE)
 2008: PSC on Iroko licence signed, offshore Cameroon
 2009: Acquisition of Addax Petroleum by the Sinopec Group. First exports of crude from Taq Taq field, Iraqi Kurdistan
Acquisition of Royal Dutch Shell's upstream assets, offshore Cameroon. Sinopec-Addax Petroleum Foundation established
 2012: Creation of Talisman-Sinopec Energy UK Ltd joint venture company. Acquisition of Total S.A.'s interest in OML 138, deep-offshore Nigeria.  Opening of Houston office, United States
 2013: Addax Petroleum promotes its corporate values, the first of it is "Integrity through Action".
 2014: OML-138 Total S.A.'s interest acquisition, fails to receive Nigerian's authorities approval.
 2015: Hit by the collapsing crude oil price and the lack of operational and exploration results, Addax Petroleum releases 70 people at its Geneva offices.
 2016: Blaming Talisman and Repsol for their poor acquisition of the UK assets, Addax Petroleum seeks a US$5.5 bn arbitration against Talisman and Repsol 
 2016: Addax Petroleum long time external auditor, Deloitte, refuses to certify the company UK branch (APUK)'s balance sheet on suspicious payments from Geneva, the Isle of Man, and in Nigeria.
 2017: Addax Petroleum's Chief Legal and Chief Executive Officers are arrested in Geneva on corruption of foreign officials charges. Eventually, Addax Petroleum agreed early July to pay 31 million Swiss francs to settle the charges with the Geneva justice department. In August, Addax Petroleum announced the shutting of its offices in Geneva, Houston and Aberdeen, thus releasing 174 people. The closure of these offices is expected to be completed on December 10, and fully effective on December 31, 2017.

Addax Petroleum hydrocarbon production
The company's average daily oil production for 2011, was 140,000 bbl/d.

Addax Petroleum has never been able to get anywhere close to that production figure.

Addax Petroleum is currently the 2nd largest oil producer in Cameroon, the 4th largest in Gabon. Addax Petroleum used to be the 5th largest in Nigeria.

The TTOPCO Joint Venture company (together with Genel Energy) was the largest oil producer in Iraqi Kurdistan.
Addax Petroleum purchased 49% of Talisman UK in 2012, to form the Talisman-Sinopec Energy UK Ltd Joint Venture company, that became Repsol-Sinopec Resources UK  in July 2016, and is the 4th largest UK oil producer.

Asset growth
Addax Petroleum has a dominantly onshore and offshore brown producing-fields asset base located in Nigeria, Gabon, Cameroon and the Kurdistan Region of Iraq, as well as the UK North Sea's Continental Shelf.

Corporate culture
Addax Petroleum's motto states, "Each step makes a difference and difference is our strength".
The company motto reflects the fact that Addax Petroleum puts strong emphasis on cross-cultural management, as the company brings together employees from many different cultural backgrounds under Chinese management.

References

External links

 Addax Petroleum
 Sinopec-Addax Petroleum Foundation

Oil companies of China